McKenzie John Boyd Banks (12 May 1917 – 26 November 1998) was an Australian rugby league player footballer who played in the 1940s.

Ken Banks, (born Marjoribanks) came from a sporting family from Georgetown, New South Wales.  He played one season of first grade with St. George Dragons in 1946 in the NSWRFL. His position was hooker and he played in 15 games that year including the 1946 Grand Final. He later played in the Newcastle competition for many years at the Central Newcastle Club.

References

1917 births
1998 deaths
Australian rugby league players
Rugby league hookers
Rugby league players from Newcastle, New South Wales
St. George Dragons players